Windsor is an unincorporated community in Walton County, in the U.S. state of Georgia.

History
A post office called Windsor was established in 1835, and remained in operation until 1902. The community most likely was named after Windsor, England, perhaps via Windsor Castle.

References

Unincorporated communities in Walton County, Georgia
Unincorporated communities in Georgia (U.S. state)
1835 establishments in Georgia (U.S. state)
1902 disestablishments in Georgia (U.S. state)